Julio César López (born 18 April 1986 in Mariano Roque Alonso) is a Paraguayan former Association Football Goalkeeper.

Teams
  Sportivo Trinidense 2006–2008
  2 de Mayo 2008–2009
  San Martín de Tucumán 2009–2014

References
 
 

1986 births
Living people
People from Mariano Roque Alonso
Paraguayan footballers
Paraguayan expatriate footballers
San Martín de Tucumán footballers
Expatriate footballers in Argentina
Association football goalkeepers